Dheekshitha Venkadeshan (born 26 June 1998), known professionally as Dhee, is an Australian singer of Sri Lankan Tamil descent. She has sung songs mostly in her step-father Santhosh Narayanan's albums and has once been nominated at the Filmfare Awards for Best Singer. She is known for her distinctive alto voice.

Early life and career
Dheekshitha was born on 26 June 1998 to a Sri Lankan Tamil father Venkadesan from Jaffna and mother Meenakshi Iyer who is a Carnatic musician. She was raised and did her schooling in Sydney, Australia. She has an elder brother Sudheekshanan. Dheekshitha is the step-daughter of  Indian music composer Santhosh Narayanan. She began her playback singing career by performing songs in two of Santhosh Narayanan albums, Pizza II: Villa (2013) and Cuckoo (2014), during breaks from her education. Dhee made a breakthrough by singing "Naan Nee" from Pa. Ranjith's Madras (2014) alongside Shakthisree Gopalan. Her work on the song saw the pair garner nominations for Best Female Singer at the Filmfare Awards and Vijay Awards.

She received critical acclaim for her work in Sudha Kongara Prasad's sports drama film, Irudhi Suttru (2016). Being used as the lead singer for Ritika Singh's North Madras-based boxer character in the film, Dhee recorded two solo songs titled "Ey Sandakaara" and "Usuru Narumbuley". Behindwoods.com stated that the first song was "another classic Santhosh number that gets your attention in no time", while noting the "pathos song by Dhee is a revelation sorts" about the latter.

Dhee later worked with Santhosh Narayanan in critically acclaimed albums including Kaala (2018) and Vada Chennai (2018), before collaborating with Yuvan Shankar Raja for the song "Rowdy Baby" in Maari 2 (2018). Singing alongside Dhanush, the film garnered popularity soon after its release. The song garnered more than 1 billion views on YouTube making it the highest viewed Tamil music videos and one of the most-viewed Indian videos of all time.

Dhee made her debut as a pop singer, under the A.R. Rahman-helmed label, Maajja, with "Enjoy Enjaami" featuring Arivu (from The Casteless Collective) on 7 March 2021. The song was produced by her step-father, Santhosh Narayanan. The lyrics were penned by Arivu. The song was immediately popular, with the music video having gained over 398 million views and more than 4.6 million likes (as of March 2022) since it premiered on YouTube. "Enjoy Enjaami" is the first song to be released under maajja. Dhee is currently preparing her debut studio album which is also being produced by maajja. The album is expected to be released by the end of 2021 and will be largely made up of contemporary jazz songs, it will also mark her first English-language release since debuting in the (Indian) music industry.

Discography

Singles

As lead artist

As playback singer

References

External links

Living people
1998 births
People from Jaffna
Singers from Sydney
Sri Lankan Tamil musicians
Australian women singers
Sri Lankan emigrants to Australia
Australian people of Sri Lankan Tamil descent
Sri Lankan Tamil women
Tamil playback singers
Tamil singers
Tamil-language singers
Australian expatriates in India
Expatriate musicians in India
21st-century Australian singers
21st-century Australian women singers